Josef Carl Peter Jacobs (15 May 1894 – 29 July 1978) PlM, was a German flying ace with 48 victories during the First World War. The victory total of the prewar flier tied him with Werner Voss for fourth place among the war's German aces. His skill in aerial warfare brought him squadron and wing-level commands. By war's end, he was the leading ace flying the Fokker Triplane. 

Postwar, Jacobs fought the communists attempting to take over Germany, before becoming a flight instructor for the Turkish Army. He was also racing both power boats and automobiles, as well as bobsledding. In line with the latter, he became a director of the Adler automobile works. In the 1930s, he also began repairing and manufacturing airplanes. As Hitler rose to power, Jacobs joined the Luftwaffe reserves as a major, but refused to join the Nazi party. He went into hiding in the Netherlands to shelter his company from the Nazis. While his Second World War experience is unknown, afterward Jacobs would own a construction crane company.

Background
Josef Carl Peter Jacobs was born in Kreuzkapelle, Rhineland, German Empire on 15 May 1894, and learned to fly in 1912, aged 18. As a schoolboy in Bonn, he had been fascinated by the activities he saw at the nearby flying school in Hangelar. There he learned to fly, under the tutelage of Bruno Werntgen. When war broke out, he joined up for the Imperial German Army Air Service to train as a pilot with Fliegerersatz-Abteilung (Replacement Detachment) 9.

Military service

1915–16
On 3 July 1915, Jacobs was posted to Feldflieger Abteilung 11 (a reconnaissance squadron) for a year, flying long-range sorties over Allied lines, his first flight occurring the evening of his arrival. His first victory over a French Caudron occurred in February 1916, however, it was unconfirmed, due to lack of independent witnesses. After leave in April, Jacobs was posted to Fokkerstaffel-West to fly a Fokker E.III Eindecker and he finally achieved his first official victory, over an enemy aircraft on 12 May 1916 when he shot down a two-seater Caudron crewed only by its pilot. A week later, he was awarded the Iron Cross First Class. At the end of July, Jacobs and his unit had been pulled back for what became a month's aerial bodyguard duty, protecting General Headquarters at Charleville. On 1 September, Jacobs left this duty that disgusted him, and returned to a front line assignment flying a Fokker E.III. On 19 September, he upgraded to a Fokker D.II. 

His old comrade in arms, Kurt Wintgens, was killed in action on 25 September; another old friend, Max Ritter von Mulzer, died in a crash the next day. Three days later, Jacobs fell ill from dysentery; the sickness waylaid him for several weeks. That same day, his airplane was painted a dark blue.

Fokker Staffel West became Jagdstaffel 12 on 6 October 1916, and Jacobs remained with it while recuperating, although a month later he transferred to Jagdstaffel 22, then under the command of Oberleutnant Erich Hönemanns, who was a personal friend.

1917–18

He achieved his second victory (this time over a Caudron R.IV) in January 1917. He achieved three officially confirmed and eight more unconfirmed victories whilst at Jagdstaffel 22, where he remained until 2 August 1917, when he transferred to Jagdstaffel 7 as its Staffelführer (commander) It was also in August that Jacobs received the Royal House Order of Hohenzollern, having previously been awarded both classes of the Iron Cross. His first combat flight leading his squadron was a memorable one. On 21 August, he led his squadron into a Jagdstaffel 26 dogfight, only to see its commander exploded in midair; upon recovery back at base, he survived a low-level landing collision with one of his pilots. On 10 September 1917 Jacobs shot down French ace Jean Matton as his seventh victim.

On 28 February 1918, Jacobs gave up his Albatros D.V and started flying the Fokker Dr.I triplane with Jagdstaffel 7, and had his aircraft finished in a distinctive black scheme. The triplane was his favoured mount until October 1918 and he used its maneuverability to his advantage, becoming the triplane's highest scoring ace, with over 30 confirmed victories.

Jacobs' victory tally slowly rose, until at 24 victories (achieved on July 19, 1918) he was awarded the coveted Pour le Mérite. Jacobs would remain with Jagdstaffel 7 until the armistice; his final victory tally was 48 enemy aircraft and balloons.

Post-World War I
Jacobs continued to fight against the Bolshevik forces in the Baltic area in 1919, with Gotthard Sachsenberg and Theo Osterkamp in Kommando Sachsenberg.

After combat against the Bolsheviks, Jacobs briefly became a flying instructor in the Turkish Army, before completely withdrawing from military activity. In addition to aviation, Jacobs was a keen participant in bob sleighing and car and speedboat racing. He won the first AVUS (the forerunner of Formula 1) race in Berlin. Later he became a director in the Adler automobile works and in the 1930s owned his own aircraft repair and manufacturing company in Erfurt.
 
After Hitler came into power, Jacobs became a major in the Luftwaffe Reserves, but declined to join the Nazi Party. Then, after refusing to let Göring become a major shareholder in his company, Jacobs moved his company to the Netherlands, and for a time after the German invasion went into hiding.

Jacobs moved to Bavaria after World War II. He owned a construction crane operation, became president of The German Bobsleigh Society, and aided aviation historians of World War I. He died in Munich on 29 July 1978.

Awards
 Pour Le Merite 
 Iron Cross, 1st and 2rd Class
 Wound Badge, 1918 version in Silver
 Prussian Military Pilot Badge
 House  Order of Hohenzollern, Knight with Swords and Crown 
 Hanseatic Cross, Hamburg Version 
 Friedrich-August Cross, 2rd Class
 Order of the White Falcon, 2rd Class with Crown and Swords
 Saxe-Ernestine House Order, 2rd Class with Crown and Swords
 Honour Cross of the World War 1914/1918

Notes

References

Further reading
 Ryheul, Johan. KEKs and FOKKERSTAFFELS - The early German Fighter units 1915-1916. Fonthill Media LLC, 2014.

External links
 Josef Carl Peter Jacobs - The Aerodrome - Aces and Aircraft of World War I
 Who's Who - Josef Jacobs
 Camouflage & Markings: Fokker Dr. I Aces
 Portrait: Josef Carl Peter Jacobs 

1894 births
1978 deaths
German racing drivers
German World War I flying aces
Luftstreitkräfte personnel
People from Rhein-Sieg-Kreis
People from the Rhine Province
Recipients of the Pour le Mérite (military class)
Recipients of the Iron Cross (1914), 1st class
Military personnel from North Rhine-Westphalia